Matthew Gerrard Smith (born 5 October 2000) is an English professional footballer who plays as a midfielder for Arsenal.

Career

Arsenal
Born in Harlow, Essex, Smith began his career at Arsenal when he was seven. He progressed through the age groups at Arsenal. He was a part of the Arsenal Academy team that reached the final of the 2017–18 FA Youth Cup. During the 2018–19 season, whilst playing for Arsenal Under-18s, he was given the opportunity to play at a higher age group with six appearances for Arsenal Under-23s. His performances earned him his first professional contract at Arsenal. The next season he played for Arsenal Under-21s during two of their 2019–20 EFL Trophy group matches and was also nominated as the Premier League 2 Player of the Month Award in January 2020.

Due to the break in the 2019–20 Premier League season due to the COVID-19 pandemic in the United Kingdom, Smith was called up by the Arsenal head coach Mikel Arteta to train with the first team. He would later be named on the bench for Arsenal for their Premier League match against Southampton. He would continue to be named on the bench for the rest of the season but never played. He was also named on the bench for the 2020 FA Cup Final which Arsenal won and earned Smith a winner's medal despite not having made his first team debut for Arsenal.

Loan to Swindon Town
Smith signed on loan for League One side Swindon Town in August 2020 for the duration of the season. He scored his first goal for Swindon in a 3–1 win against Rochdale on 12 September 2020. He was recalled by Arsenal on 1 February 2020, having featured 27 times for Swindon, contributing two goals and three assists.

Loan to Charlton Athletic
On 1 February 2021, Smith moved to a different League One side, Charlton Athletic, on loan for the rest of the 2020-21 season. He made his debut in a 3-1 defeat to Portsmouth in League One on 2 February, coming on as a substitute for Andrew Shinnie in the 77th minute.

Loan to Doncaster Rovers
On 5 July 2021, Smith again returned to League One as he joined Doncaster Rovers on a season-long loan deal, linking back up with manager Richie Wellens whom he had played under at Swindon.

Style of play 
With his technique on the ball and awareness off it, Smith typically operates as a deep-lying midfielder, taking the ball off his center-backs to either spread the play or fire passes through the lines.

Career statistics

Honours
Arsenal
FA Cup: 2019–20

References

2000 births
Living people
Sportspeople from Harlow
English footballers
Association football midfielders
Arsenal F.C. players
Swindon Town F.C. players
Charlton Athletic F.C. players
Doncaster Rovers F.C. players
English Football League players